The 1928 United States presidential election in Iowa took place on November 6, 1928. All contemporary 48 states were part of the 1928 United States presidential election. Voters chose 13 electors to the Electoral College, which selected the president and vice president. 

Iowa was won by Republican Secretary of Commerce Herbert Hoover of California (actually an Iowan by birth) who was running against Democratic Governor of New York Alfred E. Smith. Hoover's running mate was Senate Majority Leader Charles Curtis of Kansas, while Smith's running mate was Senator Joseph Taylor Robinson of Arkansas. Hoover won Iowa by a margin of 24.20 percent.

Results

Results by county

See also
 United States presidential elections in Iowa

Notes

References

Iowa
1928
1928 Iowa elections